Eddie Marsh may refer to:

 Eddie Marsh (footballer) (1927–2010), Scottish footballer
 Eddie Marsh (bishop), Canadian bishop